Filtered water may refer to:

Water filter
Water purification